The tambourin is a low-pitched tenor drum of Provence, which has also lent its name to a Provençal dance accompanied by lively duple meter music. The dance is so named because the music imitates the drum (tambour being a generic French term for "drum"), usually as a repetitive not-very-melodic figure in the bass.

The Drum

A deep, two-headed drum of Arabic origin, called the tambourin [de Provence], is mentioned as early as the 1080s and noted as the "tabor" in the Chanson de Roland). This type of instrument, commonly found in the Provence region of France, is played by a musician who wears the drum on a strap hanging from the player's left arm and elbow. The player strikes the drum head with a beater held in the right hand, and plays a little pipe with their left hand. The combination of the tambourin, played together with a small flute, known as the galoubet or flaviol, forms a Provençal pipe and tabor.

The Dance

Jean-Philippe Rameau included tambourins in many of his operas, such as Platée, Les Indes galantes, and Les fêtes d'Hébé. The last gained more fame in a keyboard arrangement from the E minor suite of his Pièces de Clavecin. The tambourin was popular throughout the 18th century and can be found in Handel's Alcina and Gluck's Iphigénie en Aulide, among others.

References

Baroque dance
European folk dances
Drums
Dance forms in classical music